Golden Brooks is an American actress. She began her career with starring role in the Showtime comedy series, Linc's (1998–2000), and later appeared in the films Timecode (2000) and  Impostor (2001).

From 2000 to 2008, Brooks starred as Maya Wilkes in the UPN/The CW comedy series Girlfriends, for which she received two NAACP Image Award for Outstanding Actress in a Comedy Series nominations. She also has appeared in films Motives (2004), Beauty Shop (2005), Something New (2006) and The Darkest Minds (2018). In 2019, she received critical acclaim for her performance in the TNT limited drama series I Am the Night.

Early life
Brooks was born December 1, 1970 in San Francisco, California. A classically trained dancer, she studied and taught ballet, jazz, and modern dance. She studied literature and sociology and is a graduate of UC Berkeley where she majored in Media Representation of Minorities with a minor in theater. She earned a Master's degree from Sarah Lawrence College.

Career
In her  early career, Brooks was active in the Rodney Theater Company. On television, she has appeared on The Adventures of Pete & Pete, Promised Land, Linc's, and The Jamie Foxx Show as a girl named Nancy, whom Jamie confuses with Fancy. Brooks also appeared in a number of films, like Hell's Kitchen, Timecode, and Impostor. From 1998 to 2000, she starred alongside Pam Grier in the Showtime comedy series, Linc's.

Brooks is best known for her portrayal of the character Maya Wilkes, Joan's former sharp-tongued secretary and now acclaimed author, on the CW sitcom Girlfriends, in which she starred alongside Tracee Ellis Ross, Persia White and Jill Marie Jones from 2000 to 2008. In 2001, she appeared in an episode of Moesha, portraying Maya Wilkes. Brooks also directed the 2006 episode titled "Hustle & Dough," and wrote the 2007  episode titled "Snap Back," which featured guest star Erykah Badu. The character  of Maya is portrayed to be several years younger than the other characters Joan, Toni, and Lynn, but, in reality, Brooks is actually the eldest of the four actors. For her performance in Girlfriends, Brooks received BET Award for Outstanding Supporting Actress in a Comedy Series in 2004, as well as two nominations for the NAACP Image Award for Outstanding Actress in a Comedy Series in 2003 and 2008.

Brooks has won Black Reel Awards for 2004 film Motives, co-starring with Vivica A. Fox and Shemar Moore. She also has starred in Beauty Shop (2005) and Something New (2006). In 2008, Brooks was cast as Kim Kaswell in the Lifetime comedy-drama pilot Drop Dead Diva, but later was replaced by Kate Levering. In 2011, she starred in the independent film The Inheritance. In 2012, Brooks joined the cast of Hart of Dixie in season 2 playing Ruby Jeffries, Mayor Lavon Hayes' ex-girlfriend from high school, who runs against him for mayor. In 2014, Brooks stars as one of five leads on the TV One reality series, Hollywood Divas.

In 2015, Brooks was cast in a recurring role of Patrick Stewart's lead character's ex-wife in the Starz comedy series, Blunt Talk. In 2016, she was cast in a series regular role opposite Damon Wayans Sr. in the Fox pilot Lethal Weapon. Brooks was fired from Lethal Weapon after the project's table read, and Keesha Sharp, her Girlfriends co-star, later replaced her in role.
 
In 2017, Brooks was cast as lead character's mother in The Darkest Minds, a young adult dystopian thriller directed by Jennifer Yuh Nelson. She also was cast in the Paramount Network drama series Yellowstone starring Kevin Costner. Later she was cast in the series regular role on the TNT drama series I Am the Night directed by Patty Jenkins, playing mother of the lead character. She received critical acclaim for her performance in I Am the Night. "Golden Brooks elevating every scene she's in", said Daniel Fienberg in his review for The Hollywood Reporter. In 2019, she reunited with her Girlfriends co-stars Tracee Ellis Ross, Jill Marie Jones and Persia White in the episode of ABC comedy series Black-ish.

Personal life
Brooks and D. B. Woodside were in a relationship from 2008 to 2010; they have a daughter together, born in 2009.

Filmography

Film

Television

Awards and nominations

References

External links

American film actresses
American television actresses
Living people
Actresses from San Francisco
Actresses from Fresno, California
Sarah Lawrence College alumni
University of California, Berkeley alumni
20th-century American actresses
21st-century American actresses
1970 births